Moycullen is a Gaeltacht civil parish in the ancient barony of the same name. The parish contains 27,294 statute acres. According to Lewis's survey of 1837, "The land is of very indifferent quality; and there is a large quantity of reclaimable waste and bog.".

Settlements in the parish include the eponymous village of the same name and the village of Spiddal.

Townlands
There are 76 townlands in the parish.

Catholic parish
There is a Catholic parish of the same name that is part of the Roman Catholic Diocese of Galway, Kilmacduagh and Kilfenora that is roughly co-extensive with the civil parish. 
The "Church of the Immaculate Conception" is located in the village.

Notable people
 Ruaidhrí Ó Flaithbheartaigh (Roderic O'Flaherty), historian and antiquary, was born in Moycullen Castle in 1630.
 (Lady Morgan) Sydney Owenson (1783 - 1859), whose 1827 novel "The O'Briens and the O'Flahertys: A National Tale", is set in the barony and mentions the túath of the O'Flaherty dynasty.

References
From :

Other sources

Civil parishes of County Galway